Nelson Kipkosgei Cherutich (born 9 March 1993) is a steeplechase runner from Bahrain. He competed at the 2016 Summer Olympics, but failed to reach the final.

References

1993 births
Living people
Bahraini male steeplechase runners
Olympic athletes of Bahrain
Athletes (track and field) at the 2016 Summer Olympics